Maria Inês Jololo (born 30 November 1975) is an Angolan handball player.

She competed at the 2000 Summer Olympics, where the Angolan team placed 9th, and also at the 2004 Summer Olympics, where Angola placed 9th.

References

External links
 

1975 births
Living people
Angolan female handball players
Olympic handball players of Angola
Handball players at the 2000 Summer Olympics
Handball players at the 2004 Summer Olympics